Elections to the United States House of Representatives in New Jersey for the 6th Congress were held October 10, 1798.

Background
All previous elections had been held on an at-large basis.  Five Federalists had been elected in the previous election.  For this election, New Jersey switched, for the first time, to using districts.

Election results
Three incumbents ran for re-election, of whom, two of whom lost to Democratic-Republicans.  The incumbents Jonathan Dayton (F) and Thomas Sinnickson (F) did not run for re-election.  In the districts with no incumbents, one was won by a Democratic-Republican and the other by a Federalist, for a net gain of 3 seats by the Democratic-Republicans

See also
United States House of Representatives elections, 1798

References

1798
New Jersey
United States House of Representatives